The Gamoneda Formation is an Emsian geologic formation of southern Bolivia.

Fossil content 
The formation has provided the following fossils:

 Acastoides gamonedensis
 Australocoelia palmata
 Australospirifer hawkinsi
 Australostrophia mesembria
 Bainella (Belenops) insolita
 Cryptonella baini
 Deltacephalaspis (Deltacephalaspis) comis
 Deltacephalaspis (Deltacephalaspis) retrospina
 Deltacephalaspis (Prestalia) tumida
 Derbyina jamesiana
 Gamonedaspis scutata
 Kozlowskiaspis (Romanops) australis
 Notiochonetes falklandica	
 Phacopina convexa
 Plicoplasia planoconvexa
 Protoleptostrophia concinna
 Pustulatia curupira
 Schizostylus (Curuyella) granulata
 Tarijactinoides jarcasensis
 Burmeisteria sp.
 cf. Francovichia sp.
 Calmoniidae indet.
 Eurypterida indet.

See also 
 List of fossiliferous stratigraphic units in Bolivia

References

Further reading 
 N. Eldredge and L. Branisa. 1980. Calmoniid trilobites of the Lower Devonian Scaphiocoelia Zone of Bolivia, with remarks on related species. Bulletin of the American Museum of Natural History 165(2):181-289
 P. E. Isaacson. 1977. Devonian stratigraphy and brachiopod paleontology of Bolivia. part A: Orthida and Strophomenida. Palaeontographica Abteilung A 155(5-6):133-192

Geologic formations of Bolivia
Devonian System of South America
Devonian Bolivia
Emsian Stage
Siltstone formations
Sandstone formations
Shale formations
Shallow marine deposits
Devonian southern paleotemperate deposits
Paleontology in Bolivia
Formations